FC Metallurg Vyksa is a Russian football team from Vyksa. It played professionally from 1994 to 1997, from 1999 to 2003 and again from the 2012–13 season until February 2015. Their best result was 4th place in Zone Povolzhye of the Russian Second Division in 2000.

In late February 2015, during the 2014–15 season's winter break, the team's main sponsor, Vyksa Steel Works, announced they can no longer afford to support the team on the professional level. All the players and staff were released from their contracts and all the remaining games of the season were forfeited.

References

External links
  Team history at KLISF

See also
FC Metallurg Vyksa 

Association football clubs established in 1923
Football clubs in Russia
Sport in Nizhny Novgorod Oblast
1923 establishments in Russia
Works association football clubs in Russia